Mia Jerkov (born 5 December 1982) is a Croatian volleyball player who  plays for BRSE Békéscsaba in the Hungarian NB1. She plays as a wing spiker.

Career
Jerkov competed with the Croatian national team in the 2001 European Championship, ranking in the 9-12th place; the 2005 European Championship, ranking in eighth place; the 2009 Mediterranean Games, winning the bronze medal; the 2010 World Championship, ranking in the 17-20th place; the 2014 World Championship, ranking in the 13-14th place;
and the 2014 World Grand Prix, ranking with her national team in the 23rd place.

Family
Mia Jerkov is the daughter of Željko Jerkov  a double Olympic medalist in basketball for Yugoslavia.

References

External links
 Mia Jerkov at the International Volleyball Federation
 
 Mia Jerkov Bio

1982 births
Living people
Croatian women's volleyball players
Croatian expatriate sportspeople in the United States
Outside hitters
Beşiktaş volleyballers
Croatian expatriate sportspeople in Turkey
California Golden Bears women's volleyball players
Expatriate volleyball players in the United States
Expatriate volleyball players in Turkey
Mediterranean Games medalists in volleyball
Mediterranean Games bronze medalists for Croatia
Competitors at the 2009 Mediterranean Games
21st-century Croatian women